Elliott Jerome Brown Jr. (born 1993) is a queer black American artist and photographer. In 2019 they received an Emerging Visual Arts Grant by The Rema Hort Mann Foundation.

Early life and education 
In 2017, Brown graduated with a BFA from New York University at the Tisch School of Arts. They also attended the Skowhegan School of Painting and Sculpture in 2017.

Work 
Brown's work is inspired by Deana Lawson, Carrie Mae Weems, and Lorna Simpson. Their work started with a focus on self portraiture to examine the complexities of gender and identity. Brown's work speaks to the black queer body by using the intimacy of portraiture as a means to question preconceived notions of maleness and blackness.

Brown has been commissioned by media outlets and fashion designers, including New York Magazine, Gayletter Magazine, The New Yorker, Vice, Teen Vogue, Dazed, W Magazine, and Telfar Clemens. Their work has been featured by W Magazine, Vice, and The Fader.

In 2017, Brown co-curated the seventh annual "Zine and Self-Published Photo Book Fair" with Devin N. Morris, titled Rock Paper Scissors and a Three-Armed Shovel.

Exhibitions

Solo exhibitions 
 Arms to pray with, Nicelle Beauchene Gallery, New York City, 2019

Group exhibitions 
 Stranger Thing, Outpost Artists Resources, Ridgewood, NY, 2017
 Four, Sargents' Daughters, New York City, 2018
 Daybreak: New Affirmations in Queer Photography, Leslie-Lohman Museum of Gay and Lesbian Art, New York City, 2018
 Do You Love Me?, P.P.O.W., New York City, 2019
 On Refusal: Representation & Resistance in Contemporary American Art, The Mac, Belfast, Northern Ireland, 2019
 Quiver of Voices, LTD Los Angeles, online exhibition, 2020
 Mien, TRNK, online exhibition, 2020

References

American LGBT photographers
21st-century American photographers
African-American photographers
Tisch School of the Arts alumni
Living people
1993 births
Skowhegan School of Painting and Sculpture alumni